Alexander Soifer is a Russian-born American mathematician and mathematics author. His works include over 400 articles and 13 books.

Soifer obtained his Ph.D. in 1973 and has been a professor of mathematics at the University of Colorado since 1979. He was visiting fellow at Princeton University from 2002 to 2004, and again in 2006–2007. Soifer also teaches courses on art history and European cinema. His publications include 13 books and over 400 articles.

Every spring, Soifer, along with other mathematician colleagues, sponsors the Colorado Mathematical Olympiad (CMO) at the University of Colorado Colorado Springs. Soifer compiles and writes most of the problems for the contest. The CMO was founded by Soifer on April 18, 1983.

For the Olympiad's 30th anniversary, the university produced a film about it. In May 2018, in recognition of 35 years of leadership, the judges and winners decided in 2018 to rename the Colorado Mathematical Olympiad to the Soifer Mathematical Olympiad.

In 1991 Soifer founded the research quarterly Geombinatorics, and publishes it with the Geombinatorics editorial board.

In July 2006 at the University of Cambridge, Soifer was presented with the Paul Erdős Award by the World Federation of National Mathematics Competitions.

Soifer was the President of the World Federation of National Mathematics Competitions from 2012 to 2018. His Erdős number is 1.

Selected books
 The Scholar and the State: In Search of Van der Waerden Springer, New York, 2015 (publisher: Birkhauser-Springer, Basel)
 Mathematics as Problem Solving Center for Excellence in Mathematical Education, Colorado Springs, 1987
 How does one cut a triangle? Center for Excellence in Mathematical Education, Colorado Springs, 1990
 Colorado Mathematical Olympiad: The First Ten Years and Further Explorations Center for Excellence in Mathematical Education, Colorado Springs, 1991
 Geometric Etudes in Combinatorial Mathematics Center for Excellence in Mathematical Education, Colorado Springs, 1994
 The Mathematical Coloring Book Springer, New York 2009
 Mathematics as Problem Solving 2nd ed. Springer, New York 2009
 How Does One Cut a Triangle? 2nd ed. Springer, New York 2009
 The Colorado Mathematical Olympiad and Further Explorations: From the Mountains of Colorado to the Peaks of Mathematics Springer, New York 2011
 The Colorado Mathematical Olympiad; The Third Decade and Further Explorations: From the Mountains of Colorado to the Peaks of Mathematics Springer, New York 2017 
 Geometric Etudes in Combinatorial Mathematics 2nd ed. Springer, New York 2010
 Ramsey Theory: Yesterday, Today, and Tomorrow, (editor and contributor) Birkhäuser-Springer 2011
 Life and Fate: In Search of Van der Waerden, appeared in November 2008 in Russian. The expanded English edition, The Scholar and the State: In Search of Van der Waerden, was published by Birkhäuser-Springer in 2017.

Geombinatorics

Geombinatorics is a quarterly scientific journal of mathematics. It was established by editor-in-chief Alexander Soifer in 1991 and is published by the University of Colorado at Colorado Springs. The journal covers problems in discrete, convex, and combinatorial geometry, as well as related areas. The journal is indexed in Zentralblatt MATH, Excellence Research Australia, and MathSciNet.

References

External links

Geombinatorics
Soifer Mathematical Olympiad

Textbook writers
20th-century American mathematicians
21st-century American mathematicians
1948 births
Mathematicians from Moscow
University of Colorado faculty
Living people